The commune of Agen is the prefecture of the Lot-et-Garonne department in Nouvelle-Aquitaine in southwestern France.

Agen may also refer to:

Places
Agen (meteorite), an H chondrite meteorite that fell to earth on September 5, 1814, in Aquitaine, France.
Agen-d'Aveyron, a commune in the Aveyron department in the Occitanie region in southern France.
Arrondissement of Agen, an arrondissement of France in the Lot-et-Garonne department in the Nouvelle Aquitaine region.
Canton of Agen-1, an administrative division of the Lot-et-Garonne department, southwestern France
Canton of Agen-2, an administrative division of the Lot-et-Garonne department, southwestern France
Canton of Agen-3, an administrative division of the Lot-et-Garonne department, southwestern France
Canton of Agen-4, an administrative division of the Lot-et-Garonne department, southwestern France.

People
of Agen
Alberta of Agen  (died ca. 286), Roman venerated as a martyr and saint
Caprasius of Agen or Saint Caprais, venerated as a Christian martyr and saint of the fourth century
Phoebadius of Agen (died ca. 392), Catholic bishop of the fourth century
William II of Agen (also known as Guillaume d'Agen), Latin Patriarch of Jerusalem in 1261–1270
surname
Addison Agen, American singer, runner up in season 13 of American The Voice
James H. Agen (1847–1921), American businessman and politician

Others
SU Agen Lot-et-Garonne, French rugby union club based in Agen